Gino Lanisse (born November 28, 1981) is a Haitian professional basketball player, who currently plays for the BBC Nyon in the Ligue Nationale de Basket in Switzerland.

Early years
Lanisse was born in Haiti.

Professional
Lanisse has played for the BBC Lausanne (LNA), MGS Grand-Saconnex (LNA), Union Neuchâtel Basket (LNA), BBC Nyon (LNA), Lugano Tigers.

References

External links
 Gino Lanisse at fiba.com
 Gino Lanisse at eurobasket.com

1981 births
Living people
Centers (basketball)
Haitian men's basketball players
Haitian expatriate sportspeople in Switzerland
Lugano Tigers players
Power forwards (basketball)
Union Neuchâtel Basket players